The Ampulomet (also rendered Ampulomyot, ampulla mortar, etc., lit. "ampule/vial thrower" cf. миномёт) was an expedient anti-tank weapon which launched a 125 mm incendiary projectile made of spherical glass.  This weapon was introduced in 1941 and used (to a limited degree) by the Red Army in World War II, but by 1942 was largely obsolete.

Design
  The weapon consisted of an unrifled tube with a crude breech mounted on a Y shaped pedestal which pivoted on trunnions to provide elevation. Two breech mounted inverted horns were provided for traverse/elevation and a simple inclinometer for targeting and range calculation. A black powder charge was inserted into the breech and fired by a percussion cap to propel the AZh-2 glass ampule. The ampules were filled with an incendiary mixture known as KS. KS was a mixture of 80% phosphorus and 20% sulfur which ignited when exposed to air. The burning liquid would seep through vision slots or engine grilles on a tank and ignite ammunition or fuel as well as choke and blind the crew.

See also
Northover Projector — A similar British weapon used by the Home Guard during World War II

References

World War II infantry weapons of the Soviet Union
125 mm artillery
Grenade launchers of the Soviet Union
Incendiary grenades
Anti-tank grenades
Weapons and ammunition introduced in 1941